Marsokhod is a Russian Mars rover project that was intended for use in the Mars-96 mission. Instead it was used for experiments into improving rover technology.

Prototypes of the Marsokhod rover were taken from Russia to the NASA Ames Research Center, where they were jointly developed by the US and Russia. This led to the development of a 'virtual environment control system', which meant the rover could be controlled remotely via an interface on a PC.

Since the development of this control interface the rover has been deployed in simulations. These experiments provide insight for robotics researchers and scientists preparing for planetary surface exploration.

References

Links 
 Interview with Carol Stoker from Planetary Systems Branch
 Marsokhod Desert Southwest Field Test
 Marsokhod: Autonomous navigation tests on a Mars-like terrain
 Small Marsokhod configuration

Mars rovers